Road 87 is a road in eastern Iran. It connects Bojnurd to Sabzevar, Bardaskan, Bajestan and Gonabad in south Razavi Khorasan.

References

External links 

 Iran road map on Young Journalists Club

Roads in Iran